CESifo Economic Studies is a journal on economics published by the CESifo Group. It was established as IFO Studien in 1955 and obtained its current title in 2002.

The journal is abstracted and indexed by the Social Sciences Citation Index, Current Contents/Social and Behavioral Sciences, EconLit, International Bibliography of the Social Sciences, Journal Citation Reports/Social Sciences Edition, ProQuest, RePEc, Scopus, Social Science Research Network, and Social SciSearch.

References

Publications established in 1955
Economics journals
English-language journals
Quarterly journals
Oxford University Press academic journals
1955 establishments in the United Kingdom